Keskipohjanmaa is a morning broadsheet newspaper published in Kokkola, Finland.

History and profile
Keskipohjanmaa was first published on 5 December 1917. Its headquarters is in Kokkola. The paper has also regional offices in Haapajärvi, Kalajoki, Jakobstad, Veteli and Ylivieska.

Keskipohjanmaa was the organ of the Centre Party until 1996 when it declared its independence.

The circulation of Keskipohjanmaa was 27,907 copies in 2006.

References

External links
Official site

1917 establishments in Finland
Finnish-language newspapers
Mass media in Kokkola
Daily newspapers published in Finland
Publications established in 1917